This is a list of player transfers involving Rugby Pro D2 teams before or during the 2021–22 season. The list is of deals that are confirmed and are either from or to a rugby union team in the Pro D2 during the 2020–21 season. It is not unknown for confirmed deals to be cancelled at a later date. Perpignan were promoted to the Top 14 having won the 2020–21 Rugby Pro D2 whilst Agen were relegated from the Top 14. Biarritz then defeated Bayonne in the promotion-relegation decider, meaning Biarritz were promoted, and Bayonne relegated. Bourg-en-Bresse and Narbonne were promoted to the Pro D2 having finished 1st and 2nd in the 2020–21 Championnat Fédéral Nationale, whilst Soyaux Angoulême and Valence Romans were relegated to the Nationale competition for the 2021–22 season.

Agen

Players In
 Grigor Kerdikoshvili from  Lelo Saracens 
 Jaba Bregvadze unattached 
 Paul Graou from  Montauban 
 Kolinio Ramoka from  Cognac Saint-Jean-d'Angély
 Florent Guion from  Rouen 
 Iban Etcheverry from  Soyaux Angoulême 
 Arnaud Duputs from  Bayonne 
 Harry Sloan from  Saracens
 Fotu Lokotui from  Glasgow Warriors
 William Demotte from  Grenoble
 Matthieu Bonnet from  Blagnac
 Théo Idjellidaine from  Toulouse (season-long loan)
 Toby Salmon from  Newcastle Falcons
 Martin Devergie from  Montpellier (season-long loan)
 Danré Gerber from  Chambéry

Players Out
 Paul Abadie to  Brive 
 Nathan Decron to  Pau
 Jordan Puletua to  Carcassonne 
 Julien Jané retired 
 Giorgi Tetrashvili to  Perpignan 
 Laurence Pearce retired 
 Johann Sadie retired 
 Romain Briatte to  Stade Français 
 Pierce Phillips to  Edinburgh
 Yoan Cottin to  Nevers 
 Fernandez Correa to  Massy 
 Marc Barthomeuf retired
 Jamie-Jerry Taulagi to  Narbonne 
 Andrés Zafra to  Brive
 Jeremy Jordaan to  Vannes 
 Hugo Verdu to  Nice
 Victor Moreaux to  Racing 92
 Sam Vaka to  Kyuden Voltex
 Noel Reid to  London Irish

Aurillac

Players In
 Adrian Moțoc from  Massy
 Yann Tivoli from  Nice
 Peter Nelson from  Bourg-en-Bresse 
 Lewis Ormond from  Taranaki
 Pierre Le Huby from  Macon
 Theo Lachaud from  Toulon
 David Delarue from  Brive 
 Julian Royer from  Valence Romans
 Elijah Niko from  Bedford Blues 
 Paul Farret from  Albi
 Gymaël Jean-Jacques from  Albi 
 Lucas Vaccaro from  Albi
 Ronan Loughnane from  University College Dublin

Players Out
 Jérôme Dufour to  Provence 
 Youssef Amrouni to  Carcassonne
 Reece Hewat to  Pau 
 Thomas Salles to  Toulon
 Adrien Corbex to  Stade Métropolitain 
 Beka Saghinadze to  Lyon
 Paul Boisset retired 
 Jack McPhee retired 
 Jean-Philippe Cassan retired 
 Bastien Coillat to  Bourgoin-Jallieu 
 Quentin Guibert to  Decazeville 
 Loïc Rouquette to  Decazeville

Bayonne

Players In
 Yann David from  Castres
 Denis Marchois from  Pau 
 Uzair Cassiem from  Scarlets 
 Jean-Teiva Jacquelain from  Mont-de-Marsan 
 Luka Chelidze from  Toulon
 Isaia Toeava from  Toulon
 Arnaud Erbinartegaray from  Mauléon
 Chris Talakai from  NSW Waratahs
 Shaun Venter from  Ospreys
 Sireli Maqala from  Fiji Sevens

Players Out
 Romain Barthélémy to  Grenoble 
 Toma'akino Taufa to  Grenoble 
 Iñaki Ayarza to  Soyaux Angoulême 
 Alexandre Manukula to  Montauban 
 Alofa Alofa to  West Harbour 
 Arnaud Duputs to  Agen
 Andre Gorin to  Hyères 
 Aymeric Luc to  Toulon
 Guillaume Ducat to  Pau 
 Mali Hingano to  Bourg-en-Bresse
 Tom Darlet to  Bourg-en-Bresse
 Ismaël Martin to  Bourg-en-Bresse
 Viliamu Afatia to  Albi
 Vincent Pelo to  Valence Romans
 Sam Nixon to  Exeter Chiefs
 Hugh Pyle to  Toshiba Brave Lupus Tokyo

Béziers

Players In
 Charly Malié from  Pau
 Giorgi Akhaladze from  Massy 
 Lionel Beauxis from  Oyonnax
 Thomas Hoarau from  Toulon
 John-Hubert Meyer from  Sharks
 Pierrick Gunther from  Pau 
 Gillian Benoy from  Suresnes 
 Jon Zabala from  Tarbes
 Watisoni Votu from  Pau
 Pierre Gayraud from  Grenoble
 Dries Swanepoel from  Cheetahs

Players Out
 Karl Wilkins to  Northampton Saints 
 Jonathan Best to  Valence Romans
 Uwa Tawalo to  Massy
 Robert Ebersohn to  Cheetahs
 Quentin Samaran to  Biarritz 
 Nicolas Lemaire to  Massy 
 Anthony Aleo to  Valence Romans
 Tristan Tedder to  Perpignan
 Santiago Iglesias Valdez to  Marcq-en-Baroeul 
 Pierre Bérard to  Bourg-en-Bresse
 Álvar Gimeno to  Valladolid

Bourg-en-Bresse

Players In
 Élie De Fleurian from  Bourgoin-Jallieu
 Matt Beukeboom from  Montauban
 Sebastián Poet from  Colomiers
 Nicolas Faure from  Valence Romans 
 Mali Hingano from  Bayonne
 Zauri Tevdorashvili from  Soyaux Angoulême 
 Tom Darlet from  Bayonne
 Ismaël Martin from  Bayonne
 TJ Ioane from  London Irish
 Latu Latunipulu from  Valence Romans 
 Elia Elia from  Harlequins
 Pierre Bérard from  Béziers
 Thibault Olender from  Perpignan

Players Out
 Pierre Bochaton from  Bordeaux
 Émile Cailleaud to  Causse Vezere 
 Lucas Estevenet to  Limoges 
 Paul Sauzaret to  Aubenas Vals
 Simon Bornuat retired 
 Peter Nelson to  Aurillac
 Audric Sanlaville to  Rouen
 Quentin Traversier retired
 Arnaud Perret retired
 Gregory Maiquez to  Stade Métropolitain

Carcassonne

Players In
 Jérémy Boyadjis from  Toulon 
 Youssef Amrouni from  Aurillac
 Louis-Mathieu Jazeix from  Macon
 Jordan Puletua from  Agen
 Aaron Carroll from  Bay of Plenty
 Tim Agaba from  Bulls
 Ciaran Breen from  University of British Columbia
 Pierre Reynaud from  Perpignan 
 Maxime Marty from  Toulouse
 Samuel Marques from  Pau 
 Johnny McPhillips from  Leicester Tigers
 Andries Ferreira from  Edinburgh
 Ignacio Calas from  Melbourne Rebels
 Dorian Jones from  Nice

Players Out
 Joël Koffi retired 
 Damien Teissedre to  Massy 
 Romuald Séguy to  Colomiers 
 Alexandre Dardet to  La Seyne 
 Alexandre Duny to  Tarbes
 Harry Glover to  Stade Français
 Darrell Dyer to  Valence Romans 
 Bakary Meité retired
 Julien Rey retired
 Sébastien Giorgis to  Gruissan 
 Lucas Méret to  Narbonne 
 Tiuke Mahoni to  Valence Romans

Colomiers

Players In
 Florian Nicot from  Pau 
 Maxime Javaux from  Valence Romans 
 Jorick Dastugue from  Rouen 
 Romuald Séguy from  Carcassonne
 Michele Campagnaro from  Harlequins
 Karl Château from  Perpignan

Players Out
 Bastien Vergnes-Taillfer to  Bordeaux
 Josua Vici to  Montpellier 
 Aurélien Beco retired 
 Jules Soulan to  Oyonnax 
 Thomas Larregain to  Castres
 Gilen Queheille to  Nice 
 Maxime Laforgue to  Soyaux Angoulême 
 Ronan Chambord to  Langon
 Sebastián Poet to  Bourg-en-Bresse
 François Fontaine to  Soyaux Angoulême
 Mees Erasmus to  Tarbes

Grenoble

Players In
 Romain Barthélémy from  Bayonne
 Thomas Fortunel from  Castres 
 Thomas Lainault from  Rouen
 Toma'akino Taufa from  Bayonne
 Jan Uys from  Bulls
 Adrien Vigne from  Tarbes
 Bautista Ezcurra from  Rugby ATL
 Pio Muarua from  Mont-de-Marsan 
 Luka Goginava from  Soyaux Angoulême
 Marnus Schoeman from  Lions
 Levi Douglas from  Toulon 
 Zurabi Zhvania from  Wasps
 Felipe Ezcurra from  Jaguares XV

Players Out
 Anthony Alves to  Mont-de-Marsan 
 Enzo Selponi to  Provence
 Taleta Tupuola to  Montauban
 Alaska Taufa to  Valence Romans 
 Nika Neparidze to  Nice 
 Théo Nanette to  Provence 
 Michaël Simutoga to  Bourgoin-Jallieu
 Dylan Jacquot to  Rouen
 Deon Fourie to  Stormers
 Leva Fifita to  Connacht
 Pierre Gayraud to  Béziers
 Crimson Tukino to  Castres
 Feybian Tukino from  Castres
 River Tukino from  Castres
 William Demotte to  Agen
 Jérôme Rey to  Lyon
 Louis Bielle-Biarrey to  Bordeaux
 Andrei Ostrikov to  Mont-de-Marsan

Mont-de-Marsan

Players In
 Anthony Alves from  Grenoble
 Gauthier Doubrere from  Biarritz
 Willie du Plessis from  Biarritz
 Thibault Tauleigne from  Oyonnax
 Pierre Sayerse from  Montauban
 Lucas Mensa from  Valence Romans
 Jules Even from  Soyaux Angoulême 
 Simon Labouyrie from  Hyères
 Andrei Ostrikov from  Grenoble
 Michael Faleafa from  Perpignan
 Lucio Sordoni from  Melbourne Rebels

Players Out
 Jean-Teiva Jacquelain to  Bayonne
 Emmanuel Saubusse to  Soyaux Angoulême 
 Christophe David to  Narbonne 
 Theo Castinel to  Narbonne
 Pio Muarua to  Grenoble
 Thibaud Rey to  Nice 
 Maselino Paulino to  Montauban 
 Clément Gelin to  Voiron
 Charles Brayer to  Valence Romans 
 Patxi Bidart to  Soyaux Angouleme
 Jens Torfs to  Nice 
 Baptiste Couchinave to  Albi
 Thomas Roche to  Chartres
 Tommy Bell to  Benetton

Montauban

Players In
 Anthony Meric from  Toulon 
 Fred Quercy from  Nevers 
 Tjiuee Uanivi from  Massy 
 Paul Bonnefond from  Vannes  
 Kevin Firmin from  Castres
 Taleta Tupuola from  Grenoble
 Raphael Sanchez from  La Rochelle 
 Segundo Tuculet from  Valence Romans
 Mirian Burduli from  Valence Romans
 Alexandre Manukula from  Bayonne 
 Maselino Paulino from  Mont-de-Marsan
 Quentin Delord from  Brive
 Dan Malafosse from  Brive
 Quentin Pueyo from  Massy 
 Louis Vincent from  Stade Français
 Wharenui Hawera from  Kubota Spears Funabashi Tokyo Bay
 Arnaud Feltrin from  Albi
 Liam Bowman from  Pacific Pride
 Nikola Matawalu from  Glasgow Warriors
 Louis Druart from  Lyon (season-long loan)

Players Out
 Pierre Klur released
 Paul Graou to  Agen
 Corentin Braendlin to  La Seyne 
 Aviata Silago to  Nevers
 Jeremy Chaput to  Narbonne 
 Kimami Sitauti to  Narbonne 
 Pierre Sayerse to  Mont-de-Marsan
 Alexandre Loubière to  Massy 
 Kilian Tripier to  Bourgoin-Jallieu
 Utu Maninoa to  Tarbes 
 Alex Luatua to  Rouen
 Evrard Dion Oulai to  Massy 
 Benoît Zanon retired 
 Paul Tailhades to  Pau
 Matt Beukeboom to  Bourg-en-Bresse
 Jens Torfs to  Nice 
 Louis Decavel to  Castelsarrasin 
 Mike Tadjer to  Perpignan
 Corentin Astier to  Nice

Narbonne

Players In
 Christophe David from  Mont-de-Marsan
 Theo Castinel from  Mont-de-Marsan
 Jeremy Chaput from  Montauban
 Kimami Sitauti from  Montauban
 Louis-Benoît Madaule from  Toulouse
 Geoffrey Moïse from  Pau 
 Paul Belzons from  Soyaux Angoulême
 Manuel Cardoso Pinto from  Agronomia 
 Jamie-Jerry Taulagi from  Agen
 Carl Axtens from  Toulouse
 Jason Robertson from  Old Glory DC
 Mohamed Boughanmi from  Pau
 Save Totovosau from  San Diego Legion 
 Lucas Lebraud from  Biarritz
 Martín Vaca from  Jaguares XV
 Lucas Méret from  Carcassonne
 Aston Fortuin from  Utah Warriors
 Luke Campbell from  Hurricanes

Players Out
 Téva Maké retired 
 Ross Bundy to  Rennes 
 Mickaël Recordier retired 
 David Smith retired 
 Léo Griffoul to  Leucate 
 Elandré Huggett to  Hyeres
 Raynor Parkinson released
 Alexandre Baron to  Gruissan
 Stellio Bessaguet to  Nice
 Manuel Cardoso Pinto released

Nevers

Players In
 Andrzej Charlat from  Provence 
 Benjamin Dumas from  Massy
 Aviata Silago from  Montauban
 Quentin Beaudaux from  Clermont (season-long loan)
 Yoan Cottin from  Agen
 Kevin Noah from  Clermont (season-long loan)
 Shaun Adendorff from  Northampton Saints
 Joaquín Blangetti from  San Martín

Players Out
 Philip du Preez to  Mâcon 
 Guram Papidze to  La Rochelle 
 David Lolohea to  Provence 
 Josaia Raisuqe to  Castres 
 Fred Quercy to  Montauban
 Nasoni Naqiri to  Soyaux Angoulême 
 Nemo Roelofse to  Stade Français
 Jean-Philippe Genevois retired
 Jean-Yves Zébango to  El Salvador
 Ilikena Bolakoro to  Dax
 Loïc Le Gal to  Nice 
 Pieter Ferreira to  Lazio

Oyonnax

Players In
 Jules Soulan from  Carcassonne
 Florian Vialelle from  Castres
 Thibault Berthaud from  Soyaux Angoulême 
 Tom Murday from  Toyota Industries Shuttles Aichi
 Kévin Lebreton from  Rouen
 Darren Sweetnam from  La Rochelle

Players Out
 Lionel Beauxis to  Béziers
 Thibault Tauleigne to  Mont-de-Marsan
 Josh Tyrell to  Biarritz 
 Antoine Zeghdar to  Castres
 Benjamin Fall released
 Frans van Wyk released
 Tim Giresse to  Valence Romans
 Lilian Camara to  Chartres
 Chris Feauai-Sautia to  Brumbies
 Josh Strauss to  Tel Aviv Heat

Provence

Players In
 David Lolohea from  Nevers
 Jérôme Dufour from  Aurillac
 Enzo Selponi from  Grenoble
 Kevin Bly from  Vannes 
 Alexandre Flanquart from  Bordeaux 
 Peter Betham from  Clermont
 Hans N'Kinsi from  Castres
 Théo Nanette from  Grenoble
 Germán Kessler from  Soyaux Angoulême
 Eroni Sau from  Edinburgh 
 Louis Marrou from  Rouen
 Luke Tagi from  Stade Français
 Federico Wegrzyn from  Jaguares XV
 Quentin Witt from  Soyaux Angoulême
 Tomás de la Vega from  Toronto Arrows (short-term deal)
 Jonathan Ruru from  Blues
 Nicolás Toth from  Jaguares XV

Players Out
 Clément Darbo to  Biarritz 
 Andrzej Charlat to  Nevers
 Bertrand Guiry retired
 Julien Le Devedec retired 
 Antonin Gontard to  Aubenas Vals
 Yohan Montès to  Beauvais 
 Romain Sola to  Bourgoin-Jallieu 
 Dorian Lavernhe to  Nice
 Baptiste Delage to  Nice 
 Thibaut Zambelli to  Nice
 Pierre Rude to  Issoire 
 Jérôme Mondoulet to  Nice
 Oleg Ishchenko retired
 Lucas De Coninck released
 Ludovic Radosavljevic to  SO Avignon

Rouen

Players In
 Taylor Gontineac from  Clermont
 Abdelkurim Fofana from  Suresnes 
 JT Jackson unattached 
 Joris Lezat from  Le Havre 
 Alex Luatua from  Montauban
 Dylan Jacquot from  Grenoble
 Amidou Marciniek from  Marcq-en-Barœul
 Willy N'Diaye from  Valence Romans
 Audric Sanlaville from  Bourg-en-Bresse
 Alexandru Țăruș from  Zebre Parma
 Psalm Wooching from  San Diego Legion
 Michael Baska from  Utah Warriors

Players Out
 Florent Guion to  Agen
 Jorick Dastugue to  Colomiers
 Thomas Lainault to  Grenoble
 William Takai retired 
 Enzo Mondon to  Tarbes 
 James Johnston to  Nice
 Yohan Domenech retired 
 Antoine Frisch to  Bristol Bears 
 Kévin Lebreton to  Oyonnax
 Louis Marrou to  Provence
 Tamaz Mchedlidze to  Dax 
 Dean Adamson to  Bedford Blues

Vannes

Players In
 Rémi Leroux from  La Rochelle
 Quentin Étienne from  Perpignan
 Rudy Paige unattached
 Jeremy Jordaan from  Agen
 Myles Edwards from  Toshiba Brave Lupus Tokyo 
 Rodney Ah You from  Newcastle Falcons
 Sacha Valleau from  France Sevens
 Alexandre Borie from  Bordeaux
 Dan Hollinshead from  Rugby United New York
 Erwan Dridi from  Toulon (season-long loan)
 Francisco Gorrissen from  Jaguares XV
 Nicolás Freitas from  Peñarol

Players Out
 Pierre Popelin to  La Rochelle
 Rémi Picquette to  La Rochelle 
 Kevin Bly to  Provence
 Rémi Seneca to  Pau
 Paul Bonnefond to  Montauban
 Joris Moura to  Valence Romans
 Bastien Fuster retired 
 Anatole Pauvert to  Valence Romans
 Florian Cazenave retired
 Brendan Lebrun to  Castres
 Alexis Levron to  Pau
 Laijaisa Bolenaivalu to  Nice
 Henry Trinder to  Ampthill
 Jeremy Jordaan released

See also
List of 2021–22 Premiership Rugby transfers
List of 2021–22 United Rugby Championship transfers
List of 2021–22 Super Rugby transfers
List of 2021–22 Top 14 transfers
List of 2021–22 RFU Championship transfers
List of 2021–22 Major League Rugby transfers

References

2021-22
2021–22 in French rugby union